"Love Dive" is a song recorded by South Korean girl group Ive for their second single album of the same name. It was released as the single album's lead single by Starship Entertainment on April 5, 2022.

“Love Dive” experienced huge commercial success in South Korea, topping the Gaon Digital Chart for four weeks and ranking as the best-performing single of the year. It received many accolades including the MAMA Award for Song of the Year, Melon Music Award for Song of the Year, and Song of the Year at the Golden Disc Awards.

Background and release
On March 15, 2022, Starship Entertainment announced Ive would be releasing their second single album titled Love Dive on April 5. Three days later, the track listing for the single album was released, with "Love Dive" confirmed as the lead single. On March 21, a promotional video titled "Dear Cupid" was released. On April 4, the music video teaser for "Love Dive" was released. The highlight medley video was also released on the same day. On April 5, the song was released as the lead single of Love Dive, alongside the music video. The following year, a Japanese version of "Love Dive" was released on January 16, 2023.

Composition
"Love Dive" was written by Seo Ji-eum, composed by Sophia Brennan, Elle Campbell, and Nick Hahn who also handled the arrangement. Musically, the song was described as a "modern" dark pop and electropop song with "addictive chorus and percussion sound" and "rhythmic bass synth and trap mix" with lyrics that "reinterpret cupid of the new era planning to shine on the stage". "Love Dive" was composed in the key of C-sharp minor, with a tempo of 118 beats per minute.

Commercial performance
"Love Dive" debuted at number nine on South Korea's Gaon Digital Chart in the chart issue dated April 3–9, 2022; on its component charts, the song debuted at number two on the Gaon Download Chart, number 13 on the Gaon Streaming Chart, and number 25 on the Gaon BGM Chart. It ascended to number one on the Gaon Digital Chart in the chart issue dated June 12–18, 2022, and number two on the Gaon Streaming Chart in the chart issue dated April 24–30, 2022. On the Billboard K-pop Hot 100, the song debuted at number 67 in the chart issue dated April 16, 2022, ascending to number one in the chart issue dated April 30, 2022. The song debuted at number two on the Billboard South Korea Songs in the chart issue dated May 7, 2022, ascending to number one in the chart issue dated July 9, 2022.

In New Zealand, the song debuted at number 26 on the RMNZ Hot Singles in the chart issue dated April 11, 2022, ascending to number 11 in the following week. In Japan, the song debuted at number 22 on the Billboard Japan Japan Hot 100 in the chart issue dated April 13, 2022; on its component charts, it debuted at number 17 on the Top Download Songs, number 16 on the Top Streaming Songs, and number one on the Top User Generated Songs. It ascended to number eight on the Japan Hot 100, and number two on the Top Streaming Songs in the following week. On the Oricon Combined Singles, the song debuted at number 15 in the chart issue dated April 18, 2022, ascending to number six in the following week.

In Singapore, the song debuted at number nine on the RIAS Top Streaming Chart and number two on the RIAS Top Regional Chart in the chart issue dated April 1–7, 2022, ascending to number two on the RIAS Top Streaming Chart and number one on the RIAS Top Regional Chart in the following week. The song also debuted at number 19 on the Billboard Singapore Songs in the chart issue dated April 16, 2022, ascending to number two in the following week. In Malaysia, the song debuted at number 19 on the RIM Top 20 Most Streamed International and Domestic Songs in the chart issue dated April 1–7, 2022, and ascending to number four in the following week. It also debuted at number four on the Billboard Malaysia Songs in the chart issue dated April 23, 2022. On the Billboard Vietnam Vietnam Hot 100, the song debuted at number 54 in the chart issue dated April 14, 2022, ascending to number six in the following week. In Indonesia, the song debuted at number 12 on the Billboard Indonesia Songs in the chart issue dated April 23, 2022. In Philippines, the song debuted at number 11 on the Billboard Philippines Songs in the chart issue dated April 23, 2022. In Taiwan, the song debuted at number 7 on the Billboard Taiwan Songs in the chart issue dated April 23, 2022. In Hong Kong, the song debuted at number 9 on the Billboard Hong Kong Songs in the chart issue dated April 23, 2022.

In United States, the song debuted at number eight on the Billboard World Digital Song Sales in the chart issue dated April 16, 2022. In Canada, the song debuted at number 92 on the Billboard Canadian Hot 100 in the chart issue dated April 23, 2022. Globally, the song debuted at number 177 on the Billboard Global 200, and number 105 on the Billboard Global Excl. U.S. in the chart issue dated April 16, 2022. It ascended to number 15 on the Billboard Global 200, and number ten on the Billboard Global Excl. U.S. in the following week.

Music video
The music video, directed by Haus of Team, was released alongside the song by Starship Entertainment on April 5, 2022. The music video portrays the girls "playing the roles of chic, modern cupids" performing in a "luxurious, ever-changing", and "mystical castle" positioned amongst clouds" with scenes that switches between "various locations within the castle" before transitioning to "breathtaking dance break performance". The music video accumulated 10 million views within 10 hours of its release.

Promotion
Following the single album's release, on April 5, 2022, Ive held a live event to introduce the single album including "Love Dive" and to communicate with their fans. The group subsequently performed on four music programs in the first week: Mnet's M Countdown on April 7, KBS's Music Bank on April 8, MBC's Show! Music Core on April 9, SBS' Inkigayo on April 10. In the second week, they performed on five music programs: SBS MTV's The Show on April 12, MBC M's Show Champion on April 13, Mnet's M Countdown on April 14, KBS's Music Bank on April 15, and SBS's Inkigayo on April 17, where they won first place for all appearances except M Countdown and Inkigayo. In the third week, they performed on The Show on April 19, and Music Bank on April 22, where they won first place for both appearances.

Reception
Tássia Assis of NME praised "Love Dive" as a strong comeback for the rookie group, describing the song as "a siren song that serpentines through dark, atmospheric bass and lilting vocals." When selecting "Love Dive" as one of the 15 best K-pop songs released in the first half of 2022, Gladys Yeo of NME praised the song for its "mystical, captivating quality." In June 2022, "Love Dive" was chosen by Time as one of the best K-pop songs of the year. Kat Moon of Time described the song as "dreamy and ethereal" with decadent vocals "you can't help but be submerged in."

Accolades
With "Love Dive", Ive became only the 4th group in K-pop history to have won both a rookie award and a daesang prize in the same year, after 2NE1, Miss A, and Aespa.

Credits and personnel
Credits adapted from Melon.

 Ive – vocals
 Seo Ji-eum – lyrics 
 Nick Hahn - composition, arrangement
 Sophia Brennan – composition
 Elle Campbell – composition

Charts

Weekly charts

Monthly charts

Year-end charts

Certifications

Release history

See also
 List of Gaon Digital Chart number ones of 2022
 List of Inkigayo Chart winners (2022)
 List of K-pop Hot 100 number ones
 List of M Countdown Chart winners (2022)
 List of Music Bank Chart winners (2022)
 List of Show Champion Chart winners (2022)
 List of The Show Chart winners (2022)

References

Ive songs
2022 songs
2022 singles
Billboard Korea K-Pop number-one singles
Gaon Digital Chart number-one singles
Korean-language songs
Starship Entertainment singles